Louisfert is a commune in the Loire-Atlantique department in western France.

Population

See also
Communes of the Loire-Atlantique department
The works of Jean Fréour Sculptor for Louisfert oratory.

References

Communes of Loire-Atlantique